Andreas Lutz (born 1970) is a retired German lightweight rower. He has won medals at a number of World Rowing Championships in lightweight quad scull (LM4x).

References 

Living people
German male rowers
World Rowing Championships medalists for Germany
1970 births